José Carlos Severino (Mandolin, Laúd & Effects) and Mário Bacelar (Nylon String Guitar & Effects) are join in the Spring of 2004 and with them the Mediterrânic Ensemble, original World/Folk Fusion Music is born.

The search of the balance between nostalgic and cheerful melodies, soft and pleasant harmonies with sensible and dancing-like rhythms in an intimist fusion  between several music from the world, is one of the characteristics of this project.

The name reflects the historical connection of the Mandolin with Italy, the Nylon String Guitar with Spain as well as some of the used Percussion.
The renaissance tone of the Mandolin, the improvisation and the construction of melodies and harmonies on the Greek modes, the harmonic ("Arabic") and Spanish scales and the use of the diatonic and pentatonic scales in a South-European perspective, equally suggest the mediterranic influence and sound of this trio.

The use of the Mediterranic term in 'English', comes from the Celtic and American Folk influences in some songs, as well as the form as in the Mandolin is sometimes executed.
Because the project has been born in Portugal (country identified with mediterranean culture, climate and diet) and because of  the "Portuguese flavour" of some compositions, it was opted for the use of the circumflex accent (^).

The Ensemble expression is a French word that not only expresses the idea of the work of three instrumentalists, but also the dynamics and musical relation, already mentioned, between melodies, harmonies and rhythms.

World/Folk Fusion Music

The World\Folk Fusion assignment means an open attitude towards all music of the world, together with  the mediterranean essence, enveloped with other sounds, such as Brazilian Popular Music, African Music, Minimal, Reggae, Progressive Folk, Celtic Music, American Folk and Jazz fusion.

Libéracion – The CD

Libéracion is a word formed with the French word 'libération' and the Spanish word 'liberación' which is comprehensible in English (liberation) and Portuguese (libertação).

Libéracion was recorded during 2006 in Algarve at the rehearsal room of the project in Lagos by Pedro Glória (percussionist and producer) and in Faro 
at the home of one of the musicians, with personal equipment 
from the musicians, the sole intervenients in the production of the CD. 
The recording equipment traveled around in the preparation of the CD.

The photos of the CD were taken during several journeys in the coast of Algarve, from one end (the city of Vila Real de Santo António) to another (Cape St Vincent).
The cover photo (the right side photo) was taken in the lighthouse at the cape. The back photo was taken in Ria Formosa, 
near the small village of Cacela Velha. The two inside photos were taken at fisherman’s beach in Albufeira.

The Songs

The 10 songs of this CD where chosen to give a wide perspective of the musical atmosphere of this project. This list gives their Portuguese title, a (self chosen) label about what might be considered the musical style of the song, and the songs.

External links

 José Carlos Severino  page

Spanish world music groups